Rosario River may refer to:

 Rosario River (Argentina)
 Rosario River (Uruguay)
 Jatun Mayu (Linares), also called Rosario, a river in Bolivia